Mikhail Yuryevich Popov (born 25 September 1985) is a Russian former footballer.

Club career
He played 9 seasons in the Russian Football National League for 4 different clubs.

External links
 
 

1985 births
Footballers from Moscow
Living people
Russian footballers
Association football defenders
FC Asmaral Moscow players
Dinaburg FC players
FC Baltika Kaliningrad players
FC Ufa players
FC SKA-Khabarovsk players
FC Solyaris Moscow players
FC Luch Vladivostok players
FC Ararat Moscow players
Latvian Higher League players
Russian expatriate footballers
Expatriate footballers in Latvia
Russian expatriate sportspeople in Latvia